Hear Us Say Jesus is the third full-length album by Seven Places on BEC Recordings. The album was released on October 5, 2004.

Track listing 
 "Fall in Line"  - 4:11 
 "Watch"  - 4:02 
 "Even When"  - 3:55 
 "Perspective"  - 3:02 
 "I Look Upon Your Hill"  - 3:54 
 "We're Almost There"  - 3:23 
 "Lay It Down"  - 3:14 
 "Someday Go"  - 4:41 
 "See The Rain (Go Away)"  - 2:41 
 "Be My Salvation"  - 4:57 
 "All in My Head "  - 3:32 
 "Holes in His Hands"  5:16

Album credits
 Produced by Aaron Sprinkle
 Engineered by Zach Hodges
 Mixed by JR McNeely
 All songs written by Seth Gilbert

References 

2004 albums
Seven Places albums
Albums produced by Aaron Sprinkle